Mordecai Najar was a  rabbi in Majorca in the first half of the 15th century, a contemporary of Simon ben Ẓemaḥ Duran, who answered some of his questions in Tashbaẓ (part i., Nos. 119, 173-174; part ii., Nos. 141, 225-232).

Jewish Encyclopedia bibliography
Azulai, Shem ha-Gedolim, i.91, No. 86;
Fürst, Bibl. Jud. iii.12.

External links
Jewish Encyclopedia article on NAJARA

References

15th-century Aragonese rabbis
Medieval Majorcan Jews